Halenia minima is a species of plant in the Gentianaceae family. It is endemic to Ecuador.  Its natural habitat is subtropical or tropical high-altitude grassland.

References

minima
Endemic flora of Ecuador
Near threatened plants
Near threatened biota of South America
Taxonomy articles created by Polbot